Theresa Paz Donahue (August 22, 1925 – March 14, 2019) was a Canadian utility player in women's baseball, playing mainly as a catcher for the Peoria Redwings of the All-American Girls Professional Baseball League from  through . Listed at 5' 2", 125 lb., she batted and threw right-handed.

Biography
Donahue was born in Saskatchewan, Canada, of Irish ancestry. As a young girl she learned to play baseball with the help of her brother in their family farm, and later played softball at school and in Moose Jaw for the local Royals team. In 1945 Donahue was invited by an All-American Girls Professional Baseball League scout to spring training the next year in Pascagoula, Mississippi. She agreed to try out and was assigned to the Redwings, an expansion team based in Peoria, Illinois. During her four seasons in the league, Donahue was primarily a catcher, but played every position except first base and pitcher. She hit .127 in 287 games, and committed 56 errors in 1051 chances for a .947 fielding average.

In 1950 Donahue joined the Admiral Music Maids of the rival National Girls Baseball League in Chicago. After that, she worked for an interior design firm in Chicago in accounting and bookkeeping for 38 years, and then retired in 1990. A longtime resident of St. Charles, Illinois, Donahue carried out her Grand Marshal duties during the St. Patrick's Day Parade in 2009. She was honored with many recognitions and awards over the years, including inductions in  the Canadian Baseball Hall of Fame, and the Saskatchewan Baseball Hall of Fame. She died in March 2019 at the age of 93 after suffering from Parkinson's disease.

In 2020, Netflix released a documentary, A Secret Love, which chronicles Donahue's ultimately 72-year relationship with her wife Emma Marie "Pat" Henschel. The couple got married on Donahue's birthday in 2015.

Batting statistics

Fielding statistics

References

1925 births
2019 deaths
All-American Girls Professional Baseball League players
Baseball people from Saskatchewan
Baseball players from Illinois
Canadian baseball players
Canadian expatriate sportspeople in the United States
Canadian sportspeople of Irish descent
Deaths from Parkinson's disease
Neurological disease deaths in Alberta
LGBT people from Illinois
Canadian LGBT sportspeople
Lesbian sportswomen
Peoria Redwings players
LGBT baseball players
21st-century American women